The Canadian Dance Festival is an annual Ottawa, Ontario event founded in 1987. Held in June, it sets the stage for Canada's most contemporary, innovative and leading edge dance choreographers and dance companies. The festival includes events at the National Arts Centre, as well as featured performances at other locations including the National Gallery of Canada and outdoor dance in Ottawa city parks and other Urban settings. It attracts international dance promoters and international media who attend the festival to follow the developments of Canadian dance and to select artists for their respective festivals and dance series.

The signature activity of the Canada Dance Festival Society, it brings together over 250 artists from across the country to participate in a 9-day event, promoting contemporary Canadian Dance. The festival is a non-profit national organization that presents live dance performances by professional artists. Since 1997, the CDF has also produced a smaller event every other year to promote its ongoing presence and to further invest in the Ottawa community. Dance Advance started as a series of free performances featuring professional and pre-professional artists from the region. Dance Advance now changes its content each year to respond to partnerships and opportunities to present artists in a less intensive environment.

External links
 Canada Dance Festival

Dance festivals in Canada
Festivals in Ottawa
Performing arts in Ottawa